Darreh-ye Baz (also Romanized as Darreh-ye Bāz, Darreh Bāz, and Darreh-i-Bāz) is a village in Karghond Rural District, Nimbeluk District, Qaen County, South Khorasan Province, Iran. In the 2006 census, its population is 257, in 68 families.

References 

Populated places in Qaen County